The Battle of the Rails (French: La Bataille du rail) is a 1946 French war film directed by René Clément. It depicts the efforts by railway workers in the French Resistance to sabotage German military transport trains during the Second World War, particularly during the Invasion of Normandy by Allied forces. Many of the cast were genuine railway workers. While critics have often historically treated it as similar to Italian neorealism, it is closer to the traditional documentaries which the director had previously worked on.

The film was shown at the 1946 Cannes Film Festival where it won the Prix international du jury and Clément won the Best Director Award. The film also won the inaugural Prix Méliès. In 1949 the film was distributed in America by Arthur Mayer and Joseph Burstyn.

Cast
 Charles Boyer as Narrator 
 Jean Clarieux as Lampin 
 Jean Daurand as Cheminot 
 Jacques Desagneaux as Athos 
 François Joux as Cheminot 
 Pierre Latour as Cheminot 
 Tony Laurent as Camargue 
 Robert Le Ray as Chef de gare 
 Pierre Lozach as Cheminot
 Pierre Mindaist as Cheminot
 Léon Pauléon as Chef de gare St-André 
 Fernand Rauzéna as Cheminot 
 Redon as Mecanicien 
 Michel Salina as Allemand

See also
Battle for the railways

References

Bibliography
 Williams, Alan. Republic of Images: A History of French Filmmaking. Harvard University Press, 1992.

External links 
 Border Crossings: Placing René Clément’s La Bataille du rail
 

1946 films
1946 war films
French war films
Films about the French Resistance
Rail transport films
History of rail transport in France
Films directed by René Clément
French black-and-white films
French World War II films
1940s French-language films
1940s French films